Rantzau may refer to:

Places 
Rantzau (Amt), an Amt in the district of Pinneberg, Schleswig-Holstein, Germany
Rantzau, Plön, a municipality in the district of Plön, Schleswig-Holstein, Germany
Rantzau (county), a former state in the Holy Roman Empire

People 
Johan Rantzau (1492–1565), German-Danish general and statesman
Balthasar Rantzau (c. 1497–1547), Prince-Bishop of Lübeck, Germany
Heinrich Rantzau (1526–1598), German-Danish humanist writer and statesman
Daniel Rantzau (1529–1569), Danish-German general
Breide Rantzau (died 1618), German nobleman in Danish service
Gert Rantzau (1558–1627) German nobleman in Danish service
Christian zu Rantzau (1614–1663), governor of the Duchy of Holstein
Jørgen Rantzau (1652–1713), Danish military officer
Josias von Rantzau (1609–1650), Danish military officer and Marshal of France
Christian Rantzau (1684–1771), Danish nobleman, civil servant and Governor-general of Norway
Schack Carl Rantzau (1717–1789), Danish-German general
Ulrich von Brockdorff-Rantzau (1869–1928), German diplomat
Heino von Rantzau (1894–1946), German Luftwaffe General

Other 
Rantzau (family), a noble family of Schleswig-Holstein, Germany
Rantzau (horse) (1946–1971), a racehorse
Rantzau (river), a river in Schleswig-Holstein, Germany
I Rantzau, an 1892 opera by Pietro Mascagni